Słudwia (river), a river in central Poland, left tributary of Bzura
 Słudwia, West Pomeranian Voivodeship, a village in northwestern Poland